Alfaya may refer to:

Alfaya (party), a political group in Guinea
Asadi al-Faya, a village in Yemen
Marcelo Alfaya (born 1978), American mixed martial artist
, Spanish journalist and novelist